Gerhard Blöchl (born 28 August 1981) is a German freestyle skier. He competed in the men's moguls event at the 2006 Winter Olympics.

References

External links
 

1981 births
Living people
German male freestyle skiers
Olympic freestyle skiers of Germany
Freestyle skiers at the 2006 Winter Olympics
People from Eggenfelden
Sportspeople from Lower Bavaria
21st-century German people